Twitch may refer to:

Biology
 Muscle contraction
 Convulsion, rapid and repeated muscle contraction and relaxation
 Fasciculation, a small, local, involuntary muscle contraction
 Myoclonic twitch, a jerk usually caused by sudden muscle contractions
 Myokymia, a continuous, involuntary muscle twitch that affects the muscles of the face
 Spasm, a sudden, involuntary contraction
 Tic, an involuntary, repetitive, nonrhythmic action
 Tremor, an involuntary, repetitive, somewhat rhythmic action
 Twitching motility, a form of crawling some bacteria use to move over surfaces

Entertainment
 Twitch (service), an Amazon subsidiary live streaming video website
 Twitch (film), a 2005 short directed by Leah Meyerhoff
 Screen Anarchy, formerly Twitch Film or Twitch, a film news and review website
 Maximilian "Twitch" Williams, a character in the comic series Sam and Twitch
"Twitch", a fictional character from the book How to Eat Fried Worms and its 2006 film adaptation
 Twitch gameplay, a computer or video game that challenges the player's reaction time

Music
 Twitch (Ministry album), 1986
 Twitch (Aldo Nova album), 1985, or the title track
 Twitch (EP), by Jebediah, 1996
 "Twitch", a 2001 song by Christina Milian from her self-titled album

People
 Stephen "tWitch" Boss (1982–2022), American freestyle hip-hop dancer, entertainer and actor
 Jeremy Stenberg (born 1981), American motocross rider

Other uses
 Twitch (device), used to restrain horses
 Twitch grass
 Twitch, in birdwatching, to pursue and observe a rare bird

See also
 Twitches (disambiguation)
Nintendo Switch